Chandee, also spelled as Chandi, is a 2013 Telugu film directed by V. Samudra starring Priyamani, R. Sarathkumar, Ashish Vidhyarthi and Krishnam Raju in the lead roles, and Ali and MS Narayana as key comedians. Scarlett Wilson appears in an item number.

The film was formally launched on 31 January 2013, with principal photography commencing on 30 October 2012. Filming took place over eight months, primarily across Hyderabad, Rajamundry and Bangkok, Thailand. The film was originally scheduled for release in the first week of October 2013, but was postponed due to political unrest in Andhra Pradesh and finally released on 8 November 2013. The movie is loosely based on the Hollywood movie The Long Kiss Goodnight.
The movie was remade in Bhojpuri in 2015 as Durga starring Rani Chaterjee and in Bangladeshi in 2016 as Rokto.

Plot

Cast
Priyamani as Ganga a.k.a. Chandee
R. Sarathkumar as Chandrasekhar Azad
Ashish Vidyarthi as Minister 
Krishnam Raju as Ashok Gajapati Raju
Vinod Kumar as IAS Officer Rao
Nagendra Babu as CBI Officer
Ranganath as Judge
Posani Krishna Murali as Inspector Gabbar Singh
G. V. Sudhakar Naidu as Assistant Commissioner 
Supreeth as Minister's accomplice
Giri Babu as Chief Minister 
M. S. Narayana
Ali as Cherry
Thagubothu Ramesh as Driver
Telangana Shakuntala
Gundu Hanumantha Rao
Kondavalasa Lakshmana Rao
Satyam Rajesh as Chandee's friend
Chitram Seenu as Chandee's friend
Kadambari Kiran as Constable
Chammak Chandra as Constable
Dasanna as Constable
Prabhas Sreenu
Raju
Scarlett Mellish Wilson as item number

Soundtrack
Krishnam Raju, Priyamani and many others attended the audio launch. Prabhas and Vidya Balan were said to attend the function, but it did not happen.

References

External links 
 

2013 films
2010s Telugu-language films
Indian action films
Indian films about revenge
2013 action films
Films shot in Andhra Pradesh
Telugu films remade in other languages
Films shot in Hyderabad, India
Films shot in Bangkok
Indian remakes of American films
Films directed by V. Samudra
Girls with guns films
Films set in Andhra Pradesh
Films shot in Rajahmundry